Jamie Long (born December 19, 1981) is an American politician serving in the Minnesota House of Representatives since 2019. A member of the Minnesota Democratic–Farmer–Labor Party (DFL), Long represents District 61B, which includes parts of southern Minneapolis in Hennepin County, Minnesota.

Since 2023, Long has served as the Majority Leader of the Minnesota House of Representatives.

Early life, education, and career
Long attended Carleton College, graduating with a Bachelor of Arts in political science, and George Washington University, graduating with a Juris Doctor.

Long has worked as an environmental attorney, an energy and transportation aide in the United States Congress. A self-described progressive, Long previously worked for former U.S. Representative Keith Ellison as his deputy chief of staff and legislative director.

Minnesota House of Representatives
Long was elected to the Minnesota House of Representatives in 2018, following the retirement of DFL incumbent Paul Thissen who was appointed to serve as an associate justice on the Minnesota Supreme Court, and has been reelected every two years since.

During the 2019-20 session, he served as an assistant majority leader and vice-chair of the Energy and Climate Finance and Policy Committee. From 2021-22, Long served as chair of the Climate and Energy Finance and Policy Committee.

After the 2022 election, Long was elected to serve as Majority Leader of the Minnesota House of Representatives, succeeding Ryan Winkler, who did not seek reelection. Long is the chair of the Rules and Legislative Administration Committee.

Electoral history

Personal life
Long and his wife, Melissa, have two children. He resides in Minneapolis's Armatage neighborhood.

References

External links

 Official House of Representatives website
 Official campaign website

21st-century American politicians
Democratic Party members of the Minnesota House of Representatives
Living people
Politicians from Minneapolis
Year of birth missing (living people)